La Cornette is a farce published by Jehan d'Abundance in 1544. Its subtitle is Farce nouvelle/tres bonne et tres joyeuse / de la cornette / a v. Personnages / par jehan d’abundance.

Plot 
The young wife of an old husband has relationships with a canon and a young man. She fulfills the latter's every expectation thanks to the generosity of the canon. The two nephews of the old husband are afraid not to inherit. They denounce her. But the valet Finet informs his mistress of this denunciation. The unfaithful wife succeeds in chasing her two enemies away.

See also 
 French Renaissance literature

Bibliography 
 Fournier, Édouard (éd.). 1872, « La Farce de la cornette », dans Le Théâtre français avant la Renaissance (1450-1550), Paris, La Place, Sanchez, (p. 439-45).
 Rousse, Michel. 1980, « Jean d’Abondance et la farce de la Cornette », dans Yves Guiraud (dir.), La Vie théâtrale dans les provinces du Midi, Tübingen-Paris, Gunter Narr-J.-M. Place, (p. 51-61).

External links 
 Article de Dora E. Polachek : Prises de bec, prises de langue : le cas de la femme au pouvoir dans la farce conjugale de la Renaissance

French plays
1540s plays